Underwater hockey has been played in Australia since 1966 and is played in most states and territories.  As of September 2013, Australia has been very successful at the international level finishing in the top three 43 times including being the world champion in various divisions 23 times out of 53 appearances at 17 international events.

History
Underwater hockey has been played in Australia since 1966.  Its introduction is attributed to Norm Leibeck, an Australian who returned from Canada both with Marlene, his Canadian bride, and a recently-acquired knowledge of underwater hockey then known as Octopush.  The first Australian Underwater Hockey Championships was held in 1975 at Margaret River, Western Australia as part of the Australian Skindiving Convention (now called the Australian Underwater Championships).  A Women's division was added to the championships in 1981 and a Junior division commenced in 1990.

Domestic competitions
Underwater hockey is played at venues in the Australian Capital Territory, New South Wales, Queensland, South Australia, Tasmania, Victoria and Western Australia. 
The national championships are held annually and as an event separate from the Australian Underwater Championships since 1994.

As of 2017, the Australia nationals have six separate divisions based on age and gender – Under 15, Under 19 Mixed, Under 19 Women's, Masters, Elite Women's and Elite Men's.

National team
Australia has played at world level since the inaugural world championship event in 1980 including hosting events in Brisbane during 1982, Adelaide during 1986 and Hobart during 2000.  Australia did not send teams to the 15th CMAS World Championship in 2007 or to the 16th CMAS World Championship in 2009.

Australia's placings in world championships

Governance
The peak body is the Underwater Hockey Commission (known as Underwater Hockey Australia) of the Australian Underwater Federation (AUF).  There are state commissions in all states and territories with the exception of the Northern Territory.
Underwater hockey has a coaching stream as part of the AUF's coaching program in underwater sport with two levels being accredited with the Australian Government's National Coaching Accreditation Scheme (NCAS).

See also

References

External links
AUF Underwater Hockey homepage
Underwater Hockey Australia – Official website of the Australian Underwater Hockey Commission

Underwater hockey
Underwater sport in Australia